Joseph Henry Burrows (May 15, 1840 – April 28, 1914) was a U.S. Representative from Missouri.

Born in Manchester, England, Burrows immigrated to the United States with his parents, who settled in Quincy, Illinois.
He attended the common schools at Quincy, Illinois, and Keokuk, Iowa.
He engaged in mercantile pursuits and later in agricultural pursuits.
He moved to Cainsville, Missouri, in 1862.
He was ordained as a minister in Cainsville in 1867.
He served as member of the State house of representatives in 1870–1874 and 1878–1880.

Burrows was elected as a Greenback to the Forty-seventh Congress (March 4, 1881 – March 3, 1883). During his term, one notable act was his appointment of John J. Pershing to the United States Military Academy.
He was an unsuccessful candidate for reelection in 1882 to the Forty-eighth Congress.
He resumed ministerial duties and also engaged in agricultural pursuits.
He died in Cainsville, Missouri, April 28, 1914.
He was interred in Oak Lawn Cemetery, near Cainsville.

References

External links

1840 births
1914 deaths
Politicians from Manchester
British emigrants to the United States
Greenback Party members of the United States House of Representatives from Missouri
Missouri Greenbacks
Members of the Missouri House of Representatives
19th-century American politicians
People from Harrison County, Missouri
Members of the United States House of Representatives from Missouri